The Speakeasy Stakes is an American Thoroughbred horse race held annually at Santa Anita Park in Arcadia, California. A race for two-year-old horses of either sex, it is run at a distance of five furlongs. From inception in 1969 through 2018 the race was run on dirt. For its forty-sixth running in 2019 it became a race on turf and was made part of the "Win and You're In" qualifying race for the Breeders' Cup Juvenile Turf Sprint. In 2010 the race was hosted by the now defunct Hollywood Park Racetrack in Inglewood, California.

Race names
 Tim Conway Stakes : 2012
 Jack Goodman Stakes : 2007-2011
 Sunny Slope Stakes : 1969-2006

Race distances
 1969: about  furlongs 
 1970-1993: 7 furlongs
 1994-2017: 6 furlongs
 2018–present: 5 furlongs

Records
Speed record:
 1:08.27 @ 6 furlongs - Secret Circle (2011)

Most wins by a jockey:
 6 - Bill Shoemaker (1970, 1971, 1973, 1975, 1976, 1982)

Most wins by a trainer:
 6 - Bob Baffert (1998, 2009, 2011, 2013, 2014, 2015)

Most wins by an owner:
 2 - Bernard J. Ridder (1977, 1978)
 2 - Cardiff Stud Farm (1979, 1982)
 2 - Karl Watson, Michael Pegram, Paul Weitman (2011, 2015)

Winners

External link
 Race video of the 2019 Speakeasy Stakes at YouTube

References

Ungraded stakes races in the United States
Flat horse races for two-year-olds
Turf races in the United States
Santa Anita Park
Breeders' Cup Challenge series
Horse races in California
Recurring sporting events established in 1969